Distrontium ruthenate, also known as strontium ruthenate,  is an oxide of strontium and ruthenium with the chemical formula Sr2RuO4. It was the first reported perovskite superconductor that did not contain copper.  Strontium ruthenate is structurally very similar to the high-temperature cuprate superconductors, and in particular, is almost identical to the lanthanum doped superconductor (La, Sr)2CuO4. However, the transition temperature for the superconducting phase transition is 0.93 K (about 1.5 K for the best sample), which is much lower than the corresponding value for cuprates.

Superconductivity
Superconductivity in SRO was first observed by Yoshiteru Maeno et al. Unlike the cuprate superconductors, SRO displays superconductivity in the absence of doping. The superconducting order parameter in SRO exhibits signatures of time-reversal symmetry breaking,  and hence, it can be classified as an unconventional superconductor.

Sr2RuO4 is believed to be a fairly two-dimensional system, with superconductivity occurring primarily on the Ru-O plane. The electronic structure of Sr2RuO4 is characterized by three bands derived from the Ru t2g 4d orbitals, namely, α, β and γ bands, of which the first is hole-like while the other two are electron-like. Among them, the γ band arises mainly from the dxy orbital, while the α and β bands emerge from the hybridization of dxz and dyz orbitals. Due to the two-dimensionality of Sr2RuO4, its Fermi surface consists of three nearly two-dimensional sheets with little dispersion along the crystalline c-axis and that the compound is nearly magnetic.

Early proposals suggested that superconductivity is dominant in the γ band. In particular, the candidate chiral p-wave order parameter in the momentum space exhibits k-dependence phase winding which is characteristic of time-reversal symmetry breaking. This peculiar single-band superconducting order is expected to give rise to appreciable spontaneous supercurrent at the edge of the sample. Such an effect is closely associated with the topology of the Hamiltonian describing Sr2RuO4 in the superconducting state, which is characterized by a nonzero Chern number. However, scanning probes have so far failed to detect expected time-reversal symmetry breaking fields generated by the supercurrent, off by orders of magnitude. This has led some to speculate that superconductivity arises dominantly from the α and β bands instead. Such a two-band superconductor, although having k-dependence phase winding in its order parameters on the two relevant bands, is topologically trivial with the two bands featuring opposite Chern numbers. Therefore, it could possibly give a much reduced if not completely cancelled supercurrent at the edge. However, this naive reasoning was later found not to be entirely correct: the magnitude of edge current is not directly related to the topological property of the chiral state. In particular, although the non-trivial topology is expected to give rise to protected chiral edge states, due to U(1) symmetry-breaking the edge current is not a protected quantity. In fact, it has been shown that the edge current vanishes identically for any higher angular momentum chiral pairing states which feature even larger Chern numbers, such as chiral d-, f-wave etc.

Tc seems to increase under uniaxial compression that pushes the van Hove singularity of the dxy orbital across the Fermi level.

Evidence was reported for p-wave singlet state as in cuprates and conventional superconductors, instead of the conjectured more unconventional p-wave triplet state. It has also been suggested that Strontium ruthenate superconductivity could be due to a Fulde–Ferrell–Larkin–Ovchinnikov phase.

Strontium ruthenate behaves as a conventional Fermi liquid at temperatures below 25 K.

References

Further reading

<

Strontium compounds
Ruthenium(IV) compounds
Transition metal oxides
Superconductors
Perovskites